Kōryū Tadaharu (光龍 忠晴, born 4 February 1984) is a Mongolian former sumo wrestler from Ulan Bator. His highest rank was maegashira 11. He was forced to retire from sumo in 2011 after being found guilty of match-fixing.

Early life and sumo background
Munkh-Orgil Erdene's father was a motocross rider, and he followed in his footsteps by participating in the sport from ages 10–16.  He was also active in basketball and his team won the national high school first and second years' championship. Later, the Hakkaku stable coach, former yokozuna Hokutoumi came to Mongolia looking for new wrestlers. A competition was held and Erdene did sufficiently well, along with two other tryouts, later wrestlers Hoshihikari and Hoshizakura to gain acceptance into the stable.  However, at the time, each stable was limited to two foreign wrestlers each, so the other two went to Hakkaku stable and Erdene was allowed to enter another stable,  Hanakago. He came to Japan to join this stable and entered professional sumo in November 2000. The first character of his shikona or ring name was at the behest of his coach, who on his first visit to Mongolia, found the sun of the high plains of Mongolia bright and glorious.

Career 
He did not manage to achieve sekitori promotion to jūryō until January 2007. He was the first member of his stable to reach sumo's second highest division since it was re-established by the former sekiwake Daijuyama in 1992. After about a year and a half in jūryō, he gained promotion to makuuchi, but was demoted the next tournament after winning only three bouts.  A convincing 10-5 record at jūryō #5 in the next tournament put him right back in the top division, where he would last two tournaments.

After about a year in jūryō, his reappearance in makuuchi in January 2010 following another 10-5 performance was his third promotion to the top division. However, a poor 3-12 record saw him demoted to jūryō once again for March. He returned to makuuchi after an 11-4 record which included a playoff for the jūryō championship, but his fifth attempt at a winning score in the top division in the May tournament proved unsuccessful. Nevertheless, he was back in makuuchi once again in September 2010. In the following November tournament he finally managed a winning record in his sixth tournament in the top division.

Retirement from sumo
Koryu was one of 23 wrestlers found guilty of fixing the result of bouts after an investigation by the Japan Sumo Association, and he was forced to retire in April 2011.

Fighting style
Koryu was an oshi-sumo specialist, preferring pushing and thrusting techniques. The Sumo Association lists tsuppari, a series of rapid thrusts to the chest, as his favourite. His most common winning kimarite was oshidashi, or push out.

Family 
Kōryū was married in 2010, with the reception taking place in January 2011. The couple have a daughter, born in April 2010.

His mother's brother in law is the uncle of fellow Mongolian wrestler Shōtenrō.

Career record

See also
Glossary of sumo terms
List of non-Japanese sumo wrestlers
List of past sumo wrestlers

References

External links
 
 Complete biography and basho results (Japanese)

1984 births
Living people
Mongolian sumo wrestlers
Sportspeople from Ulaanbaatar
Sportspeople banned for life